The Garden of Morning Calm is an arboretum located at the east of Seoul, in the Gapyeong district of South Korea. On 300,000 m², it houses 5,000 species of plants, some rare or endangered and attracts 600,000 tourists per year. The name of this garden reminds that Korea is often nicknamed the "country of the morning calm".
There are different festivals in this garden, especially in winter with a light festival.

Designed in 1996 by professor Han San-kyung of Sahmyook University with the ambition of spreading the Korean interpretation of beauty, it is an artistic space based on concepts of asymmetry and balance. It is divided into twenty sections. The Garden of Plants, for example, is home to about 1,000 species of flowers from all over Korea. The most popular part is Sukgeun Garden, which takes the shape of the Korean peninsula, symbolizing the desire for reunification.

References

External links
 Official website
 

Gapyeong County
Parks in Gyeonggi Province
Gardens in South Korea